Chaturaphak Rangsarit Bridge (written as Jaturapak Rangsarit) is a historic bridge in Bangkok. This bridge crossing over the canal Khlong Phadung Krung Kasem at Lan Luang Road, and also called in short as Saphan Khao (สะพานขาว, "white bridge") according to its colour characteristics.

His Majesty the King Chulalongkorn (Rama V) ordered the Department of Public Works to build in 1903, the construction was completed in 1904, H.M.the King gave the name "Chaturaphak Rangsarit Bridge", the term "Chaturaphak" means Phra Phrom (Brahma in Thai perception), one of three supreme gods of Hinduism who has four faces, it was later on rebuilt to be a concrete bridge in 1953, with simple concrete hand rails on both sides and the name plate in the middle, at the four corners of the bridge, there is one concrete light pole at each end, along with two more similar bridges were added to increase the traffic lanes.

This bridge is one of five bridges crossing over Khlong Phadung Krung Kasem all having the name in the meaning of created by the god (consisted of Thewet Narumit Bridge, Wisukam Narueman Bridge, Makkhawan Rangsan Bridge, Thewakam Rangrak Bridge and Chaturaphak Rangsarit Bridge, respectively). 

Chaturaphak Rangsarit Bridge is located at the tip of cheap clothing market Bobae near the Ministry of Social Development and Human Security. Crossing Khlong Phadung Krung Kasem is Maha Nak Market or Saphan Khao Market, the largest wholesale fruit market in Bangkok, this arae is colloquially known as Maha Nak.

References

1904 establishments in Siam
Bridges in Bangkok
Pom Prap Sattru Phai district
Dusit district
Registered ancient monuments in Bangkok